Fergusonite is a mineral comprising a complex oxide of various rare-earth elements. The general chemical formula of fergusonite is (Y,REE)NbO4, where REE = rare-earth elements in solid solution with Y. Yttrium is usually dominant (the mineral in this case being referred to as fergusonite-(Y)), but sometimes Ce or Nd may be the major rare-earth component (in fergusonite-(Ce) and fergusonite-(Nd), respectively). The other rare-earth elements are present in smaller amounts, and tantalum sometimes substitutes for some of the niobium. There are Fergusonite-beta-(Nd), Fergusonite-beta-(Y), Fergusonite-beta-(Ce) forms too, but they are classified as 4.DG.10 in the Nickel–Strunz system. The mineral has tetragonal crystal symmetry and the same structure as scheelite (calcium tungstate, CaWO4), but can be metamict (amorphous) due to radiation damage from its small content of thorium.  It is found as needle-like or prismatic crystals in pegmatite. It was named after British politician and mineral collector Robert Ferguson of Raith (1767–1840).

See also
 List of minerals
 List of minerals named after people

References

Lanthanide minerals
Niobium minerals
Oxide minerals
Tetragonal minerals
Minerals in space group 88